Richard Steele (1672–1729) was an Irish writer and politician .

Richard Steele may also refer to:
Richard Steele (footballer), Northern Mariana Islands footballer
Richard Steele (minister) (1629–1692), English Presbyterian minister and Puritan author
Richard Steele (referee) (born 1944), American boxing referee
, phycologist using the standard author abbreviation R.L.Steele
Sir Richard Steele (public house), a public house in London

See also
Richard Steel, lead guitarist for Spacehog